Bylaw (alternatively Bylaw EP; stylised in all caps) is the fourth EP by Dutch DJ Martin Garrix. The EP was released in five parts, with a song being released each day from 15 to 19 October before being released in full on 19 October 2018, similar to the release schedule of Garrix's previous EP Seven. The EP features collaborations with Blinders, Dyro, Pierce Fulton, and Linkin Park singer Mike Shinoda. Details of the releases were initially leaked and thought to be rumours based on Garrix's website being updated, until Garrix confirmed the details through his Twitter. The first track, "Breach (Walk Alone)" with Blinders, was released on 15 October 2018. "Yottabyte", "Latency", "Access" and "Waiting for Tomorrow" followed on 16, 17, 18 and 19 October 2018, respectively.

Promotion
On 13 October, Garrix posted a video of a plus symbol with static inside of it to his Facebook page; he denied that he was set to release a full-length album, later sharing videos of five static blocks to his Instagram as well as images of five fingers. His website then displayed a countdown, which ended at midnight on 15 October 2018, at which time, Garrix released the first track from the EP, "Breach (Walk Alone)", through music platforms.

Track listing

Charts

Note

References

2018 EPs
Martin Garrix albums